The London and Port Stanley Railway (L&PS or L&PSR) was a Canadian railway located in southwestern Ontario.

History
The L&PS was one of the first railways to be built in Ontario, with construction starting in 1856.  It provided connections between London, St. Thomas and Port Stanley. It was built primarily to facilitate trade with the United States, particularly of wood and coal. As a result of its rail connection, a substantial investment was made in the port facilities of Port Stanley, which in turn attracted American and Canadian shipping.  Until 1932, coal from Conneaut, Ohio was transported via railway car ferries to Port Stanley.

The railway also proved popular with local residents, particularly in the summer when many commuters utilized the system to travel to Port Stanley's beach and resort facilities. However, the railway's service was not always impeccable, as it also earned the nicknames Late & Poor Service, Lost & Presumed Sunk, and Lean, Push & Shove.

Originally, the railway operated steam locomotives, with the first passenger train arriving in 1856.  In 1914 the line was leased by the City of London, which proceeded to electrify it. The City bought the line outright in 1950, 36 years into its 99-year lease. During the 1950s passenger traffic suffered from automobile competition, and passenger operations were suspended in February 1957. The Canadian National Railways purchased the line in 1965.

The London & Port Stanley Railway was inducted into the North America Railway Hall of Fame (NARHF) in 2008 in the "Local" category for "Communities, Business, Governments and Groups" for those who have made significant contributions or achievements relating to the railway industry. The L&PS made good use of the Canada Southern Railway Station in St. Thomas (home to NARHF,) helping to make it one of the busiest station in the country in the early 20th century.

The portion of the line from London to St. Thomas is now part of the CN Talbot Subdivision, while the St. Thomas to Port Stanley portion is operated by the Port Stanley Terminal Rail.

Rolling Stock

Boxcab electric locomotive L1, electric interurban 14 and the Port Stanley incline cars are preserved at the Elgin County Railway Museum in St. Thomas.

Trailer 3 and motor cars 4 and 8 are preserved at the Halton County Radial Railway, near Rockwood, Ontario. The latter is operational, while the former two are stored awaiting restoration.

A boxcar from circa 1929 is preserved in Whitby, Ontario at The Station Gallery.

Gallery

See also

 List of Ontario railways
 London and Port Stanley Railway for MSTS Review
 London and Port Stanley Railway for MSTS Playthrough.

References

External links 

 Review of the London and Port Stanley Railway for MSTS (Now OpenRails)

Rail transport in London, Ontario
History of rail transport in Elgin County
Rail transport in St. Thomas, Ontario
Defunct Ontario railways
Canadian National Railway subsidiaries
Interurban railways in Ontario
Electric railways in Canada